The Bath Ranch, also known as the Bath Brothers Ranch and the Stone Ranch, was established near Laramie, Wyoming by Henry Bath about 1869-70. It was one of the first ranches in Albany County. The initial homestead was replaced by the present stone house and barn in 1875, using stone quarried locally by Henry and his sons. Since the area was populated by hostile Native Americans, the buildings were designed as fortified refuges. The Bath family became prominent in Wyoming society in subsequent years.

Description
The house is 1-1/2 stories. A kitchen and a dining room are location in the back under a shed-roofed extension, with public rooms in front and bedrooms upstairs. The front wall is built up to 1-1/2 stories with low windows lighting the upstairs rooms.

The barn is also 1-1/2 stories, with a gambrel roof. The stone walls only extend to the floor of the loft, with frame construction above.

The Bath Ranch was placed on the National Register of Historic Places on December 13, 1985. It continues to be managed by descendants of Henry Bath and his brothers Earl, Mervin and Alwyn, raising horses and cattle.

References

External links
 Bath Brothers Ranch website
 Bath Ranch at the Wyoming State Preservation Office

National Register of Historic Places in Albany County, Wyoming
Buildings and structures completed in 1875
Ranches on the National Register of Historic Places in Wyoming